Robert Matthew Hurley (born June 28, 1971) is an American college basketball coach and former professional player who is the head coach of the Arizona State Sun Devils. He was previously the head coach at the University at Buffalo.

As a college player, he was a consensus first-team All-American for the Duke Blue Devils, with whom he won consecutive national championships. He is the all-time leader in assists in NCAA basketball. He played in the National Basketball Association (NBA) for the Sacramento Kings and Vancouver Grizzlies from 1993 to 1998.

Playing career
Born in Jersey City, New Jersey, Hurley was a basketball star at St. Anthony High School in Jersey City, where his father, Bob Hurley Sr., was the longtime coach. While at St. Anthony from 1985 to 1989, Hurley led the team to four consecutive Parochial B state titles. In his senior year he averaged 20 points, 8 assists and 3 steals, as St. Anthony racked up a 32–0 record, the school's first Tournament of champions crown, and the No. 1 ranking in the United States. In his high school career the team's overall record with Hurley as point guard was 115–5.

Hurley was a point guard for coach Mike Krzyzewski's Duke University team from 1989 to 1993.  He was a first-team All-American in 1993, went to the Final Four three times, and helped lead the Blue Devils to back-to-back national championships in 1991 and 1992 with All American teammates Christian Laettner and Grant Hill, earning Final Four Most Outstanding Player honors in 1992.  Hurley remains the NCAA all-time assists leader with 1076 assists, and Duke's single game assist leader with 16 (against Florida State on February 24, 1993).  His Duke jersey number 11 was retired in 1993.  In 2002, Hurley was named to the ACC 50th Anniversary men's basketball team as one of the fifty greatest players in Atlantic Coast Conference history. In 2006, Hurley, who is of Polish descent through his mother, was inducted into the National Polish American Sports Hall of Fame. At Duke, Hurley was a member of the Sigma Phi Epsilon fraternity. Coincidentally, Bobby Hurley played against his younger brother Dan in an NCAA Tournament game, when Duke squared off against Seton Hall.

Hurley was selected by the Sacramento Kings as the seventh pick in the 1993 NBA draft. He signed a shoe contract with a new shoe company ITZ (In The Zone), which was sold at Foot Locker exclusively.

On December 12, 1993 while Hurley was returning home following a game in his rookie season, he was involved in a car accident. His SUV was broadsided by a station wagon. Hurley was not wearing a seat belt, was thrown from his vehicle, and suffered severe life-threatening injuries. Kings teammate Mike Peplowski was driving five minutes behind Hurley and was among the first on the scene to render immediate aid.

Hurley returned to the NBA for the 1994–95 season and played four more years beyond that. He was traded to the Vancouver Grizzlies on February 18, 1998, and played in 27 games for the Grizzlies. Hurley was waived by the Grizzlies on January 25, 1999.

Retirement
After retiring, Hurley went on to become a thoroughbred racehorse co-owner with Nik Visger and breeder. He was also hired as a scout by the Philadelphia 76ers in 2003.

Hurley appeared in the 1994 feature film Blue Chips, where he played for the Indiana team under coach Bobby Knight.

A fan of thoroughbred horse racing, Hurley owned Songandaprayer who won the 2001 Fountain of Youth Stakes. He currently owns Devil Eleven Stables.  In December 2009 he was sued by PNC Bank for defaulting on a $1 million loan that was used to purchase Songandaprayer, who was trained by Eddie Plesa Jr.

Coaching 
On April 13, 2010, Wagner College announced that Hurley was hired as an assistant coach for the men's basketball team. Hurley joined his younger brother Dan Hurley's coaching staff. Dan Hurley had been hired as Wagner's head coach on April 6, 2010. In 2012, the Hurleys took coaching positions at Rhode Island.

On March 26, 2013, Hurley was named the head coach of the Buffalo Bulls, replacing Reggie Witherspoon. Hurley coached the 2014–15 Bulls team to their first NCAA tournament appearance.

On April 9, 2015, Hurley was hired as head coach at Arizona State. In his first conference game with the Sun Devils, he gained notoriety when he got ejected for 2 technical fouls in 15 seconds for arguing with the officials against the rival Arizona Wildcats. After he got ejected, he encouraged the crowd to continue to taunt the officials. Following a 15–17 first season at Arizona State, Hurley's contract was extended through 2021. A second season showed improvements and ASU improved its roster with transfers and a few recruits. During his third year as head coach, Hurley would lead Arizona State to their first 12–0 start and sweep their non-conference schedule. Along the way, ASU beat Top-10 teams Kansas and Xavier and were ranked #3 by the Associated Press. With three senior guards leading the way during that time, they began to market themselves as 'Guard U' to start the 2017–18 Pac-12 Conference schedule against their rivals Arizona Wildcats. Following the 77–70 loss Feb 15, he fell 0–6 against his biggest rival Arizona Wildcats. Despite their early season success, the Sun Devils struggled mightily in conference play, going only 8–10 and earning the 9th seed in the Pac-12 tournament, where they were defeated in the first round by the 8th seeded Colorado Buffaloes. Nevertheless, ASU still earned a bid to the NCAA Tournament and faced Syracuse in a First Four matchup in Dayton. The Orange then beat the Sun Devils 60–56, thus ending their season. Hurley's squad finished 20–12, 8–10 in the Pac-12, his best season so far as the Sun Devils' coach.

On December 22, 2018, Hurley led the Sun Devils to its first home win (and second win ever) against a #1 NCAA ranked team (Kansas).

Head coaching record

See also
List of NCAA Division I men's basketball career assists leaders

References

External links
 Buffalo Bulls bio
 NBA bio

1971 births
Living people
All-American college men's basketball players
American expatriate basketball people in Canada
American men's basketball coaches
American men's basketball players
American people of Polish descent
Arizona State Sun Devils men's basketball coaches
Basketball coaches from New Jersey
Basketball players from Jersey City, New Jersey
Buffalo Bulls men's basketball coaches
College men's basketball head coaches in the United States
Competitors at the 1990 Goodwill Games
Duke Blue Devils men's basketball players
Goodwill Games medalists in basketball
McDonald's High School All-Americans
Medalists at the 1991 Summer Universiade
Parade High School All-Americans (boys' basketball)
Point guards
Rhode Island Rams men's basketball coaches
Sacramento Kings draft picks
Sacramento Kings players
St. Anthony High School (New Jersey) alumni
Universiade gold medalists for the United States
Universiade medalists in basketball
Vancouver Grizzlies players
Wagner Seahawks men's basketball coaches